Albania is home to 247 natural lakes and more than 800 artificial lakes. The natural lakes, most of karstic or glacial origin, based on their origin, are classified as the following, 4 tectonic, 134 ice-dammed,
94 karst and 15 river. Lagoons are present along the coastal region.

List of natural lakes 

Other smaller natural or glacial lakes include Lura Lakes, Lake Sheep, Lake Gistova, Lake Gramë, Lake Buni Jezercë, Lake Dash, Lake Sylbicë, Lake Dhënve, Lake Sope and Lake Malik, which was drained by government's decision.

List of artificial lakes

See also  

 Biodiversity of Albania
 Climate of Albania
 Geography of Albania
 Protected areas of Albania

References 

Albania
Lakes
Landforms of Albania